Olisa is both a surname and given name. Notable people with the name include:

 Olisa Adibua, Nigerian radio personality
 Olisa Agbakoba (born 1953), Nigerian lawyer and activist
 Olisa Metuh Nigerian lawyer and politician
 Ken Olisa (born 1951), Nigerian British businessman and the first black Lord-Lieutenant of Greater London
 Victor Olisa, senior officer in the Metropolitan Police in London, England